Kab is the name of the twelfth and last month of the Afghan calendar. It occurs in the late winter season (from February 19/20 to March 19/20). It has 29 days in usual years but 30 days in leap years.

Kab corresponds with the tropical Zodiac sign Pisces. Kab literally means "fish" in Pashto.

Events

Observances and holidays 
 27 Kab: St. Patrick's Day
 29 Kab: Feast of St. Joseph
 Last Tuesday of Kab: Chaharshanbe Suri

Movable observance 
 Lantern Festival: Held 15 days following the Chinese New Year, date falls on first or second week of this month

Pashto names for the months of the Solar Hijri calendar

ps:کب(مياشت)